The Durban University of Technology (DUT) is a multi-campus university situated in KwaZulu-Natal, South Africa. It was formed in 2002 following the merger of Technikon Natal and ML Sultan Technikon and it was initially known as the Durban Institute of Technology. It has five campuses in Durban, and two in Pietermaritzburg. In 2022, approximately 31 991 students were enrolled to study at DUT.  The university is one of five technical institutions on the African continent to offer Doctoral Degrees.

History 
The Durban University of Technology is a result of the merger, in April 2002, of two technikons, ML Sultan and Technikon Natal. It was named the Durban Institute of Technology and later became the Durban University of Technology in 2007.

KwaZulu-Natal's Indian population began arriving in the 1860s to primarily work as indentured labourers on the sugar plantations. In 1927, those with no formal educational qualifications were threatened with repatriation. This threat stimulated adult classes in literacy, as well as a range of commercial subjects, held in a mission school and a Hindu Institute, but it was not until after the Second World War, and thanks to substantial financial support from the public, that ML Sultan College came into being. It would be another decade, however, before the City Council, now preoccupied with the structures of the first Group Areas Act of 1950, allocated suitable land for a permanent campus.
 
The Natal Technical College was founded in 1907 and immediately began providing tuition to more than 350 part-time students. The structures of apartheid as it was codified through legislation weighed heavily on this institution as well. In 1955 the college was taken over by national education authorities; and in 1967 it became an exclusively white institution.

DUT Council
Wiseman Madinane is the Chairperson of the University Council.
Brenda Ntombela is the Deputy Chairperson of the University Council.

The DUT student body elects a Student Representative Council annually.

DUT Campuses 
 Brickfield Campus, Durban
 City Campus, Durban 
 Indumiso Campus, Pietermaritzburg
 ML Sultan Campus, Durban
 Ritson Campus, Durban
 Riverside Campus, Pietermaritzburg
 Steve Biko Campus, Durban

Leadership & Operations 
The university employs 841 academic staff, 51 percent of them female and 48 percent holding masters and 43 percent doctoral degrees.

Some of the senior members of the leadership team include:
Thandwa Mthembu, Vice-Chancellor and Principal
Vuyo Mthethwa, Deputy-Vice Chancellor: People & Operations
Suren Singh, Acting Deputy Vice-Chancellor: Teaching & Learning
Keolebogile Motaung, Acting Deputy Vice-Chancellor: Research, Innovation & Engagement
Maditsane Nkonoane, Registrar
Nthanyiseni Dhumazi, Chief Financial officer

The six faculties include:
Faculty of Accounting & Informatics
Faculty of Applied Sciences 
Faculty of Arts & Design
Faculty of Engineering & the Built Environment
Faculty of Health Sciences
Faculty of Management Sciences
Each Faculty is led by an Executive Dean. The academic ambit of DUT resides under the Deputy Vice-Chancellor: Teaching & Learning.

DUT Business School 
The Durban University of Technology launched the DUT Business School in 2021.  The Business School offers its new Masters of Business Administration (MBA) programme, Postgraduate Diploma in Business Administration (PDBA) programmes, Higher Certificate programmes and a variety of Executive Education and short learning programmes. 

The DUT Business School also designs tailor-made, in-house programmes and collaborates with corporate, public and non-profit organisations to develop and capacitate employees in various areas.

Student enrolment
Whilst the Durban University of Technology offers contact learning, DUT is also a member of COIL, which is the Collaborative Online International Learning consortium.

In 2022, there were 31 991 registered students. This includes under-graduates, Masters and Doctoral/PhD candidates.

Rankings 

  
  
In 2021, the university was ranked by the Times Higher Education World University Rankings for the first time in its history. It ranked within the top 500 universities in the world, and within the top 5 in South Africa. It was also the first time in history that the province had two universities rank within the top 5 in the country. In 2022, DUT remained in the Top 5 of all 26 South African Universities, was the number 1 University of Technology in the country and in the top one third globally.

Notable alumni 
The university has a large alumni body. Mr Alan Khan was the first President of the DUT Convocation in 2002. Miss Zama Mncube is the current President of the Convocation and Chairperson of the Convocation Executive. She was also the first women President of the DUT Convocation, after being elected to the position in 2022. Presidents of the DUT Convocation, in chronological order, include:

 Mr Alan Khan (2002)
 Mr Wiseman Madinane (2008)
 Mr Siyabonga Vezi (2016)
 Ms Zama Mncube (2022)

The university has a list of famous alumni, including:
 Gordon Murray - Engineer and designer, McLaren Automotive and Gordon Murray Automotive  
 Jeremy Maggs - TV news presenter 
 Alan Khan - radio presenter  
 Lance Klusener - cricketer
 Nthati Moshesh - actress
 Celeste Ntuli - comedienne and actress
 Black Coffee (DJ) - DJ, record producer, singer and songwriter  
 Zakes Bantwini - multi-award-winning singer, record producer and businessman
 Sarah Richards - sculptor
 Schabir Shaik - businessman
 Bongiwe Msomi - South Africa national netball team player
 Candice Forword - field hockey forward for the South Africa women's national field hockey team
 Billy Nair - politician, a member of the National Assembly of South Africa, an Anti-Apartheid Movement activist and a political prisoner in Robben Island.
 Berry Bickle - artist
 Zwakele Mncwango - politician, Provincial Leader of KwaZulu-Natal Democratic Alliance (South Africa) (DA)
 Babalo Madikizela - politician, Eastern Cape MEC for Public Works since May 2019 and a Member of the Eastern Cape Provincial Legislature since November 2018, provincial treasurer of the African National Congress (ANC) since October 2017.
 Mandisa Mashego - politician, A member of the Economic Freedom Fighters, party's provincial chairperson in Gauteng from 2018 to 2020, Member of the Gauteng Provincial Legislature from 2014 to 2020.

Honorary Doctorates 
 Mrs P Naidoo	April 2008
 Professor E J da Silva (posthumous)	April 2008
 Mr A Verster	April 2009
 Dr M Hinoul	April 2009
 Mr J N Kollapen	April 2009
 Mr N Soobben	April 2010
 Dr I I Sooliman	September 2010
 Mr I G Murray	April 2011
 Mr B S Biko (posthumous)	April 2011
 Mr M L Sultan (posthumous)	April 2011
 Mr R H L Strachan	April 2011
 Professor L Nkosi (posthumous)	April 2012
 Ms W Y N Luhabe	April 2012
 Vice-Admiral J R Mudimu	April 2012
 Professor N S Ndebele	April 2012
 Mr S Nxasana	September 2012
 Ms E Gandhi	September 2012
 Mr S G Pretorius	April 2013
 Mr J Naidoo	September 2013
 Mrs L G Ngcobo	April 2014
 Mr S E P Peek	April 2014
 Mr S G Govender	April 2014
 Mr A H Singh	September 2014
 Mr D D B Mkhwanazi	September 2014
 Mr Joseph Shabalala	April 2015
 Mr Richard Maponya	April 2015
 Mr Desmond D’Sa	September 2015
 Mr Ahmed Kathrada	April 2016
 Mrs G T Serobe	September 2016
 Mr Kumi Naidoo	September 2017
 Judge Navanethem Pillay	September 2017
 Dr A M Mlangeni	April 2018
 Ms E N Mahlangu	September 2018
 Mr J Clegg	September 2018
 Mr S Mchunu	September 2018
 Mr W Nzimande	September 2018
 Mr B P Vundla	September 2019
 Professor Z K G Mda  June 2021
 Ms Thembi Mtshali-Jones July 2022

References

Education in Durban
Public universities in South Africa
Educational institutions established in 2002
2002 establishments in South Africa